Cat River may refer to:

Cat River (Ontario), in Kenora District, Ontario, Canada
Cat River (Minnesota), in Minnesota, United States